Barbara Wall (born 25 May 1948) is a former squash player from Australia.

Wall turned professional in 1973, the first Australian woman to do so. She travelled overseas in 1976 and the following year, though unseeded, managed to make the final of the British Open, where she lost to Heather McKay. Wall followed up with victories in the Danish, Irish and Belgian Open Championships and a win at the South African Champion of Champions. In 1979 she won the British Open as the number 8 seed, beating Sue Cogswell of England in the final 8-10, 6–9, 9–4, 9–4, 9–3. 

Wall represented Australia in the 1979 Women's World Team Squash Championships and trained under Shirley de la Hunty.

Wall was named Western Australian Sports Star of the Year in 1979 and in 1988 was inducted into the Western Australian Hall of Champions.

References

Wall, Barbara
1948 births
Living people
Western Australian Institute of Sport alumni